WTBF-FM (94.7 FM) is a radio station broadcasting a mixed Talk/Personality and oldies music format. Licensed to Troy, Alabama, United States.  The station is currently owned by Troy Broadcasting Corp. and features programming from Citadel Media (formerly ABC Radio Networks).

WTBF-FM currently simulcasts the AM station during some dayparts, and breaks away for Rush Limbaugh, Clark Howard, Ken Hamblin and sports talk shows weekdays, and for sports and syndicated nostalgia shows on weekends.   The station also airs music from Citadel's The True Oldies Channel radio network.

Jess Jordan and Bob "Pappy" Tolbert were the mainstays of WTBF Radio during its first 30 years.  Their voices were very familiar to listeners in Pike County, and both were extremely active in the Troy community.
 
Joe Gilchrist is the original engineer, and still owns the station, along with Asa Dudley and Jim Roling.  Jim Roling worked there as a teenager in the 1950s and 1960s, left for South Carolina, then returned in 1980 and bought out one of the original owners.  Jim hosted "The Morning Show" since returning in 1980 until semi-retirement in 2007, and is a well-known icon in Pike County.

"Doc" Kirby (so nicknamed for his trumpet playing abilities) has been the Program Director since 1974, with one break from 1985 to 1986 when he was a band director at a local school and was replaced by then Morning Show co-host, Joey Meredith.  Since 1986, Doc has developed a weekly program called "On The Bookshelf," which is syndicated on the Alabama Radio Network.  Doc also became a Methodist minister.

Other long-term employees include Ralph Black, who worked there from the late 1970s until the mid-1980s, when he started the Troy State Sports Network.  He was the voice heard on every Troy broadcast game.  Ralph was bought out by the college in 2002, and replaced by Barry McKnight, who hosts a sports call-in show on WMSP in Montgomery.  Ralph came back to WTBF in 2002, and in 2007 became the host of "The Morning Show".

Many WTBF staffers have gone on to greener pastures—Tonya Terry (WSFA-TV), Michael Buchanan (the Auburn Network & play by play voice of the LaGrange High Grangers), Chris Ingram (Washington, DC radio), Russell Wells (program director at WSVH in Savannah, GA), and so on.

Other popular programs include "Crosby's Country Classics," which was hosted by local personality Ray Crosby from 1998 to 2006.  Ray returned in 2008. In late 2007, Joey Meredith returned to the airwaves on WTBF helming the popular Sunday morning gospel music request show, Gospel Favorites.  Allen Stevens helps Joey with the abundance of phone calls on Sunday mornings on the Gospel show.

The engineer is Wade Giddens, who spends three days a week at WTBF and four days a week at WAAO in Andalusia.  Joe Gilchrist retired after 59 years on the job, but still owns the station.

WTBF was located on the Troy University campus by the lagoon, from 1947 to 1997.  This original site was torn down in February, 2008.

On June 18, 1997, Joe Gilchrist flipped the switch at the transmitter site.  Larry Wells was operating with one CD player at what staffers called "Skylab", the old studios, and Jim Roling and Doc Kirby were waiting at the brand new studios at 67 West Court Square.  At 3:00 p.m., Larry faded the music, Joe flipped the switch, and Jim and Doc signed on from the new location.

WTBF Today 
AM 970 has updated their format to an all sports programming. The AM station broadcasts CBS's popular sports line up 24 hours a day Monday-Saturday. Pausing for religious programming and local church services on Sundays until 1:00pm. 
FM 94.7, licensed to Brundidge, airs about 4 hours per day of live local programming, but tune in the rest of the day an you'll hear "Good Time Oldies" playing the top billboard hits from the late 60s through mid 80s.
FM 94.7 provides its listeners with Crosby's Country Classics Saturday mornings from 6:00-10:00, while Sunday Mornings are devoted to gospel music and other religious programming until noon. 
WTBF FM and AM proudly serves as a training ground for countless broadcast majors every year.

References

External links

TBF-FM
News and talk radio stations in the United States
Oldies radio stations in the United States
Radio stations established in 1947
1947 establishments in Alabama